The 3rd Central Executive Committee of the Chinese Communist Party (Chinese: 中国共产党第三届中央执行委员会) was in session from 1923 to 1925, while China was a a republic. The 2nd Central Executive Committee of the Chinese Communist Party preceded it. The 4th Central Executive Committee of the Chinese Communist Party followed.

The 3rd Central Bureau of the Chinese Communist Party held a plenary session at this time.

Members
Chen Duxiu
Cai Hesen
Li Dazhao
Tan Pingshan
Wang Hebo
Mao Zedong
Zhu Shaolian
Xiang Ying
Luo Zhanglong

Alternate Members
Deng Pei
Zhang Lianguang
Xu Meikun
Li Hanjun
Deng Zhongxia

External links
 3rd Central Executive Committee of the CPC, People's Daily Online.

Central Committee of the Chinese Communist Party
1923 establishments in China
1925 disestablishments in China